Greaves is a small lunar impact crater that lies near the southwest edge of Mare Crisium. It is a circular, bowl-shaped formation with a small interior floor at the center of the sloping inner walls. The crater is intruding into the northern edge of the lava-flooded crater Lick. To the northwest is Yerkes, and to the northeast is Picard.

This formation was previously designated Lick D, a satellite crater of Lick, before it was given a name by the IAU.

See also 
 Asteroid 9899 Greaves

References

External links
 LTO-62A1 Yerkes — L&PI topographic map

Impact craters on the Moon